Arhopala perimuta, the yellowdisc oakblue or yellowdisc tailless oakblue, is a species of butterfly belonging to the lycaenid family described by Frederic Moore in 1857. It is found in Southeast Asia (Sikkim to Assam, Burma, Thailand, Mergui and Peninsular Malaya).

Subspecies
Arhopala perimuta perimuta (Sikkim to Assam, northern Burma, central Burma, northern Thailand)
Arhopala perimuta regina Corbet, 1941 (southern Burma, Mergui, southern Thailand, Peninsular Malaysia)

References

External links
"Arhopala Boisduval, 1832" at Markku Savela's Lepidoptera and Some Other Life Forms

Arhopala
Butterflies described in 1857
Butterflies of Asia
Taxa named by Frederic Moore